Chrysina adolphi is a species of ruteline scarab beetle from central America. They are found in the Sierra Madre del Sur in the Mexican states of Guerrero and Oaxaca where they feed on the leaves of Quercus species. Adults emerge from July to September.

References 

Rutelinae